Trimma cana, the Candy cane pygmy-goby, is a species of goby native to the western Pacific Ocean where it can be found from the Philippines to Palau. This species can reach a length of  SL.

References

External links
 

cana
Taxa named by Richard Winterbottom
Fish described in 2004